The Pahranagat Range is a mountain range in Lincoln County, Nevada.

References

See also 
 Pahranagat Valley
 Pahranagat National Wildlife Refuge
 Alamo bolide impact

Mountain ranges of Nevada
Mountain ranges of Lincoln County, Nevada